Dil Deke Dekho(English: Try Giving your Heart) is a 1959 Indian Hindi romantic comedy film. It was Nasir Hussain's second film as a director after Tumsa Nahin Dekha (1957), which became a big hit and gave star Shammi Kapoor a new image as a comedic, dancing hero. Hussain and Kapoor reteamed with this film. also in this, Asha Parekh, a former child actress, made her film debut as a heroine. This is also music composer Usha Khanna's first film.

The film became a hit at the box office. Hussain, Kapoor, and Parekh would re-team again for Teesri Manzil (1966), which also became a big hit. Hussain would also cast Parekh as his leading lady in five other films. Shammi Kapoor had said that he had initially wanted Waheeda Rehman and these role were also been offered to actress Sadhana to play his leading lady in the film, but the producer had already signed Asha Parekh, and he encouraged her during filming. The film was released on Asha's 17th birthday.

Plot
Neeta is an heiress, the only daughter of U.K. based Industrialist Jagatnarayan. She is of marriageable age and is being wooed by Kailash, Chandar and Raja. She prefers Chandar over Kailash and Raja, but subsequently changes her mind and falls in love with Raja. Things take a dramatic turn when Jagatnarayan and Neeta find out that Raja is not who he claims he is. When Raja defends himself and calls himself Roop, his very own mother denies this claim and instead states that Chandar is Roop, her only son. Raja must now make attempts to prove himself as Roop and realizes that this is indeed an uphill task.

Cast
Shammi Kapoor as Roop / Raja
Asha Parekh as Neeta
Sulochana Latkar as Jamna 
Raj Mehra as Jagatnarayan
Rajendranath as Kailash
Surendra
Indira Billi venna
Mumtaz Ali
Wasti

Soundtrack
The Soundtrack of the movie was composed by Usha Khanna, with the lyrics written by Majrooh Sultanpuri.

Almost all her songs are memorable.
Some music lovers feel they had  an O. P. Nayyar touch to them.

References

External links
 

1959 films
1950s Hindi-language films
Films directed by Nasir Hussain
Films scored by Usha Khanna